Fadel Mohammad Antar (born 13 November 1995) is a Lebanese footballer who plays as a striker for  club Shabab Sahel and the Lebanon national team.

Club career

Early career 
Antar began his career at Safa in 2017, playing two games in the 2017–18 Lebanese Premier League. He then joined Tadamon Sour in 2018, helping them win the Lebanese Challenge Cup in 2018. On 17 August 2020, Antar joined Bourj. He terminated his contract on 18 May 2021, having scored five goals in the 2020–21 Lebanese Premier League.

Shabab Sahel 
On 28 May 2021, Antar moved to Shabab Sahel on a three-year contract. He scored a hat-trick against Safa on 18 September, helping his team win 5–0. The following matchday, on 25 September, Antar scored four goals against Tripoli in a 4–1 win. He finished the first half of the season as top scorer, with 10 goals in 11 games. Despite having left mid-season, Antar finished top scorer of the 2021–22 Lebanese Premier League, joint with Mahmoud Siblini.

Kelantan 
On 9 January 2022, Malaysia Premier League side Kelantan announced the transfer of Antar, ahead of the 2022 season. He was quickly dubbed "the next [Mohamad] Ghaddar", a Lebanese player who had also played for Kelantan. He officially joined on loan from Shabab Sahel on 27 February. Antar scored on his debut on 13 March, in a 2–1 defeat to Super League club Petaling Jaya City in the first round of the Malaysia FA Cup.

International career
Antar represented Lebanon internationally at under-23 level.

He was first called up to the senior team in view of the 2022 FIFA World Cup qualification matches in October 2021. On 1 December 2021, Antar made his senior debut in the 2021 FIFA Arab Cup, as a substitute in a 1–0 defeat to Egypt.

Career statistics

International

Honours
Tadamon Sour
 Lebanese Challenge Cup: 2018

Individual
 Lebanese Premier League top goalscorer: 2021–22
 Lebanese Elite Cup top goalscorer: 2021

Notes

References

External links

 
 
 
 

1995 births
Living people
People from Tyre District
Lebanese footballers
Association football forwards
Safa SC players
Tadamon Sour SC players
Bourj FC players
Shabab Al Sahel FC players
Kelantan F.C. players
Lebanese Premier League players
Malaysia Premier League players
Lebanon youth international footballers
Lebanon international footballers
Lebanese expatriate footballers
Lebanese expatriate sportspeople in Malaysia
Expatriate footballers in Malaysia
Lebanese Premier League top scorers